Jan Larsen (March 22, 1945 – March 9, 1993) was a Danish football (soccer) player, who played 29 games as a defender for the Denmark national football team from 1968 to 1971. He was named 1970 Danish Football Player of the Year. During his career, he played for HB, AB, and Skovshoved IF.

External links
Danish national team profile

1945 births
1993 deaths
Danish men's footballers
Denmark international footballers
Danish football managers
Havnar Bóltfelag players
Akademisk Boldklub players
Akademisk Boldklub managers
Association football defenders
Skovshoved IF players